Helmut Heinhold (1 July 1927 – 7 November 2008) was a German rower who competed in the 1952 Summer Olympics. In 1952 he was a crew member of the German boat which won the silver medal in the coxed pair event.

External links
 

1927 births
2008 deaths
Olympic rowers of West Germany
Rowers at the 1952 Summer Olympics
Olympic silver medalists for Germany
Olympic medalists in rowing
German male rowers
Medalists at the 1952 Summer Olympics
European Rowing Championships medalists